The fourth season of the Canadian police drama Rookie Blue starring Missy Peregrym, Ben Bass and Gregory Smith premiered on May 23, 2013 on Global in Canada.

Production
On June 26, 2012 ABC and Global announced that the show was renewed once again for a fourth season just three episodes into its previous season.
On March 21, 2013 ABC and Global announced the season premiere would be May 23, 2013.

Priscilla Faia and Rachael Ancheril joined the main cast, whilst former main cast member Melanie Nicholls-King returned as a recurring guest star. Adam MacDonald and Eric Johnson continued to recur, whilst Aliyah O'Brien joined the guest cast as Holly Stewart. This was the first season not to feature Noam Jenkins, and the last to feature Lyriq Bent amongst the main cast.

Cast

Main Cast 
 Missy Peregrym as Officer Andy McNally
 Gregory Smith as Officer Dov Epstein
 Enuka Okuma as Detective Traci Nash
 Travis Milne as Officer Chris Diaz 
 Charlotte Sullivan as Officer Gail Peck
 Peter Mooney as Officer Nick Collins
 Matt Gordon as Officer Oliver Shaw
 Lyriq Bent as Sergeant Frank Best
 Priscilla Faia as Officer Chloe Price
 Rachael Ancheril as Officer Marlo Cruz
 Ben Bass as Detective Sam Swarek

Recurring 
 Eric Johnson as Detective Luke Callaghan
 Melanie Nicholls-King as Officer Noelle Williams
 Aliyah O'Brien as Dr. Holly Stewart

Episodes

U.S. Nielsen ratings
The following is a table for the United States ratings, based on average total estimated viewers per episode, of Rookie Blue on ABC.

References

2013 Canadian television seasons